Dickenson (or Dickinson), was launched at Philadelphia in 1770. Missing volumes online and missing pages in extant volumes means she first appeared in Lloyd's Register (LR) in 1776.

The Lieutenant commanding the British tender  seized the snow Dickinson (or Dickenson), William Meston, master, on 7 April 1776 at King Road, off Avonmouth in the Bristol Channel. Dickinson had been on her way to Nantes when Dickinsons crew brought her into Bristol. She carried documents describing all the vessels the American rebels were sending to France.

In 1776 a new owner purchased Dickenson and renamed her Saint Joseph.

On 25 September 1776 St Joseph, Y.Barra, master, arrived at Bristol from Bilbao. On 5 December she sailed for St. Andero.

St Joseph was last listed in 1779.

Citations

References
 

1770 ships
Ships built in Philadelphia